Balat is a surname. Notable people with the surname include:

 Alphonse Balat (1818–1895), Belgian architect
 Isaiah Balat (1952–2014), Nigerian politician and businessman